The Corsicana Marl is a geologic formation in Texas. It preserves fossils dating back to the Cretaceous period. It is primarily consisted of clay and mud, while a secondary rock type being sandstone.

See also

 List of fossiliferous stratigraphic units in Texas
 Paleontology in Texas

References
 
 

Geologic formations of Texas
Cretaceous System of North America